Venezuela competed at the 2022 World Games held in Birmingham, United States from 7 to 17 July 2022. Athletes representing Venezuela won two silver medals and one bronze medal. The country finished in 55th place in the medal table.

Medalists

Invitational sports

Competitors
The following is the list of number of competitors in the Games.

Duathlon

Venezuela won one bronze medal in duathlon.

Karate

Venezuela won one silver medal in karate.

Men

Women

Kickboxing

Venezuela competed in kickboxing.

Road speed skating

Venezuela competed in road speed skating.

Sumo

Venezuela competed in sumo.

Track speed skating

Venezuela won one silver medal in track speed skating.

References

Nations at the 2022 World Games
2022
World Games